The canton of Chartres-3 is an administrative division of the Eure-et-Loir department, northern France. It was created at the French canton reorganisation which came into effect in March 2015. Its seat is in Chartres.

It consists of the following communes:
Bailleau-l'Évêque
Chartres (partly)
Lèves
Mainvilliers
Saint-Aubin-des-Bois

References

Cantons of Eure-et-Loir